Hacı Ömer Sabancı (1 January 1906 – 2 February 1966) was a Turkish entrepreneur, who founded a number of companies, which later formed the second largest industrial and financial conglomerate of Turkey, the Sabancı Holding. He initiated the establishment of a dynasty of Turkey's wealthiest businesspeople.

Early life
He was born in Akçakaya village, a small village in Kayseri Province in central Anatolia, Turkey. In 1921, a couple of years after the death of his father, the then fifteen-year-old youngster left his hometown and walked all the way to Adana to seek his fortune.

Career
Hacı Ömer started his new life as a cotton picker. Soon, he became a broker for cotton harvesters. With the money he saved in a few years, Hacı Ömer entered the cotton trade, and in 1932 became a co-owner of a cotton spinning plant. At that time, the people working for him called him "Aga" ("Boss"). In 1943, he became a partner of YağSA, and in 1946 of MarSA, both production plants of vegetable oil and margarine, respectively. In 1948 Hacı Ömer established his own bank Akbank. In 1951 in Adana he founded the textile company Bossa, which became the largest integrated textile facility in Turkey. In the following years, he founded Oralitsa (1954), a roofing material factory, and Aksigorta (1960), an insurance company.

In 1928, he married Sadıka (1910–1988), who bore him six sons, İhsan (1931–1979), Sakıp (1933–2004), Hacı (1935–1998), Şevket (1936–2021), Erol (born 1938) and Özdemir (1941–1996). Hacı Ömer Sabancı and his family moved to Istanbul after purchasing, in 1951, a mansion known as "Atlı Köşk" ("Equestrian Villa") on the European shore of Bosphorus in Emirgan. This house is used as the Sakıp Sabancı Museum today.

He died, a self-made rich man, on 22 February 1966 in İstanbul. He is commemorated by the holding company of the group, Hacı Ömer Sabancı Holding, which was founded 1967 soon after his death in Adana. A charity institution, Hacı Ömer Sabancı Foundation "Vaksa" was established also in 1974 in Adana and named after him. The foundation built, among other things, a high school sports hall in İstanbul, a cultural center in Adana, dormitories in Ankara and Adana, and primary schools in Kayseri and Van, which are dedicated to him.

External links
 Biography at Sabancı Holding website 
 Milestones of Sabancı Holding

References

1906 births
1966 deaths
People from Talas, Turkey
20th-century Turkish businesspeople
Omer